Agalma okeni is a species of siphonophore in the family Agalmatidae.  It was first described by Johann Friedrich von Eschscholtz
, who collected it on his second voyage.  It was described again by James Dwight Dana in 1859, who named it Crystallomia polygonata.

References

External links 
 iNaturalist observations of Agalma okeni
 Illustration of Agalma okeni by James Dwight Dana

Agalmatidae
Taxa named by Johann Friedrich von Eschscholtz
Animals described in 1825